Salepur-Tangi (Sl. No.: 87) is a Vidhan Sabha constituency of Cuttack district, Odisha.

This constituency includes Salepur block and 11 Gram panchayats (Govindpur, Jaripada, Harianta, Napanga, Bhatimunda, Kanheipur, Uchapada, Kotsahi, Garudagaon, Safa and Salagaon) of Tangi-Chowdwar block.

Elected Members

Sixteen elections were held between 1951 and 2019. 
Elected members from the Salepur-Tangi constituency are:

2019: (94): Prasanta Behera (BJD)
2014: (87): Prakash Chandra Behera (INC)
2009: (94): Chandra Sarathi Behera (BJD)
2004: (41): Kalindi Charan Behera (BJD)
2000: (41): Kalindi Charan Behera (BJD)
1995: (41): Rabindra Ku. Behera (Congress)
1990: (41): Kalindi Charan Behera (Janata Dal)
1985: (41): Mayadhar Sethi (Congress)
1980: (41): Mayadhar Sethi (Congress-I)
1977: (41): Kalindi Charan Behera (Janata Party)
1974: (41): Baidhar Behera (Congress)
1971: (38): Batakrushna Jena (Utkal Congress)
1967: (38): Surendranath Patnaik (Orissa Jana Congress)
1961: (105): Baidhar Behera  (PSP)
1957: (73):Baidhar Behera (PSP)
1951: (76): Surendranath Patnaik (Congress)

.

Election results

2019
In 2019 election, Biju Janata Dal candidate 	Prasanta Behera is ahead of BJP candidate Prakash Chandra Behera by a healthy margin as people are happy with the BJD  candidate Prasant Behera.

Notes

References

Assembly constituencies of Odisha
Politics of Cuttack district